San Martino Alfieri is a comune (municipality) in the Province of Asti in the Italian region Piedmont, located about  southeast of Turin and about  southwest of Asti.

San Martino Alfieri borders the following municipalities: Antignano, Costigliole d'Asti, Govone, and San Damiano d'Asti.

The town is partially named after .

References

External links
 

Cities and towns in Piedmont